Rud Zard-e Kayed Rafi (also Romanized as Rūd Zard-e Kāyed Rafī‘; also known as Rood Zard, Rūd-e Zard, Rūd Zard, Rūd Zard-e Kārafī) is a village in Rud Zard Rural District, in the Central District of Bagh-e Malek County, Khuzestan Province, Iran. At the 2006 census, its population was 92, in 21 families.

References 

Populated places in Bagh-e Malek County